Coronura is a trilobite in the order Phacopida, that existed during the Middle Devonian in what is now New York, U.S.A. It was described by Hall and Clarke in 1888, and the type species is Coronura aspectans, which was originally described under the genus Asaphus by Conrad in 1841. The species was described from the Onondaga Formation. Fossils of Coronura have also been found in Indiana, and in the Emsian to Givetian Floresta Formation, Altiplano Cundiboyacense, Colombia.

References

Bibliography 
 

Dalmanitidae
Devonian trilobites of North America
Extinct animals of the United States
Devonian United States
Devonian trilobites of South America
Devonian Colombia
Fossils of Colombia
Fossil taxa described in 1888
Floresta Formation